Chris and Conrad is Chris and Conrad's only studio album, released on May 5, 2009 through VSR Music Group. The first single from the album is their cover of Brooke Fraser's "Lead Me to the Cross". The second single is "You're the One".

Track listing
"You're the One" (3:40)
"Rescue" (3:44)
"Lead Me to the Cross" (3:42)
"Always There" (3:24)
"Buried Alive" (4:27)
"Ignition (Interlude)" (0:51)
"Love Revolution" (3:44)
"Sing Hallelujah" (4:00)
"Breathe Your Life" (3:17)
"Let It Out" (3:58)
"Who I Really Am" (3:49)
"I'm At Home" (4:16)

2009 albums
Chris and Conrad albums